Francesco Pacini (born 1906, date of death unknown) was an Italian modern pentathlete. He competed at the 1932 Summer Olympics.

References

External links
 

1906 births
Year of death missing
Italian male modern pentathletes
Olympic modern pentathletes of Italy
Modern pentathletes at the 1932 Summer Olympics
People from Fermo
Sportspeople from the Province of Fermo
20th-century Italian people